Ariana Afghan Airlines Flight 701 was the flight involved in a fatal air accident on 5 January 1969, when a Boeing 727 with 62 people on board crashed into a house on its approach to London Gatwick Airport in heavy fog. Due to pilot error the flaps were not extended to maintain flight at final approach speed.

At 0135 on a Sunday morning on which the Gatwick area was affected by patches of dense freezing fog, Boeing 727 registration number YA-FAR (the only such aircraft in the company's fleet) descended below its correct glide slope as it approached the airport from the east. As it passed over the hamlet of Fernhill on the Surrey/Sussex border, it hit trees and roofs, began to roll and crashed into a field south of Fernhill Lane,  short of the runway. It collided with a large detached house, demolished it and caught fire.

Forty-eight passengers and crew died, and two adult occupants of the house were killed when it was destroyed by the impact. A baby in the house survived with minor injuries. The captain, first officer, flight engineer and eleven passengers also survived.

Location
Until boundary changes brought it fully into West Sussex (and the borough of Crawley) in 1990, it straddled the Sussex/Surrey border and was in the parish of Burstow. The two main roads, Peeks Brook Lane and Fernhill Road (named Fernhill Lane at the time of the accident), run south–north and west–east respectively.

The crash site was a field west of Peeks Brook Lane, south of Fernhill Lane and east of Balcombe Road, a B-road which forms the eastern boundary of the airport. Antlands Lane is further to the south. A house called Longfield south of Fernhill Lane was destroyed by the impact.

Accident

Flight FG 701 from Kabul International Airport to Gatwick Airport was a weekly scheduled service which stopped intermediately at Kandahar, Istanbul, and Frankfurt. A crew change also took place at Beirut, at which point Captain Nowroz, First Officer Attayee and Flight Engineer Formuly took charge.

Weather in the Gatwick area overnight on 4–5 January 1969 was poor. There was heavy, freezing fog,  although the airport remained open. (International regulations require airports to remain open irrespective of ground conditions, in case of emergencies.) Reports for London Stansted Airport (the designated alternate destination for this flight) and London Heathrow Airport indicated much clearer conditions, and the flight could also have returned to Frankfurt as enough fuel was carried.

As the aircraft approached Fernhill and was within  of Gatwick's runway, it clipped the top of some oak trees in the garden of a house called Twinyards on Peeks Brook Lane. It then left tyre marks on the roof of the neighbouring house and knocked chimney-pots off the house opposite, a further  on. It then caught a television aerial and another group of trees, damaging components on the right-side wing. As it started to roll, the aircraft's wheels touched down briefly and it started to rise again. It failed to clear Longfield, a detached house owned by William and Ann Jones which stood  further west, and completely destroyed it. One engine landed in the wreckage of the house along with the rear section of the fuselage, while the forward section of the aircraft disintegrated over a  trail. The fuel spilt and immediately caught fire, engulfing the fuselage and the wreckage of the house. The Joneses were killed, but their baby survived with minor injuries: the sides of her cot collapsed inwards, "forming a protective tent under one of the engines".

Residents of Peeks Brook Lane were the first to arrive at the crash site and to contact the emergency services. The first call was received at 0138 at Surrey Police's control room, and officers were dispatched from Horley police station. The first officers arrived seven minutes later, soon followed by PC Keith Simmonds of Oxted station who was on traffic duty that night and who saved the injured baby from the wrecked house. The fire services were also summoned at 0138, and vehicles arrived from 0156 onwards. Surrey and Sussex Fire Brigades sent 20 vehicles to the scene, and more were supplied from the airport by the British Airports Authority. Board of Trade accident investigators led by George Kelly also went to the scene. Despite a considerable police presence, their efforts were affected by onlookers obstructing them in the narrow lanes. Police blocks were set up at both ends of Fernhill Lane, and other officers were stationed at Antlands Lane diverting traffic away from Balcombe Road.

Aircraft
The Boeing 727 was less than a year old at the time of the accident and was Ariana's only such aircraft. YA-FAR was built in February 1968 and received its American airworthiness certificate on 25 March 1968. On 29 April 1968 it was granted its registration in Afghanistan, and that country issued its own airworthiness certificate on 14 May 1968. At the time of the crash, the aircraft had recorded 1,715 hours of flying time.

Accident investigators from the Board of Trade took the wreckage to a hangar at Farnborough Airport for analysis. Also involved in the investigation were officials from the United States and Afghanistan. A preliminary statement was issued on 17 January 1969, and the full accident report followed in June 1970.

Crew and passengers
Captain Rahim Nowroz, First Officer and co-pilot Abdul Zahir Attayee and Flight engineer Mohammed Hussain Furmuly were injured but survived. The five flight attendants were killed. Captain Nowroz qualified as a pilot in 1956, was employed by Ariana the following year as a co-pilot and had flown 10,400 hours since then—including 512 in Boeing 727 aircraft, which he qualified to fly after training in 1968.

There were 54 passengers on board, 43 of whom were killed. The other 11 suffered serious injuries; they had mostly sat in the forward section of the aircraft. Apart from one girl from the United States, all were from Afghanistan, Pakistan and India (especially the Punjab region). There was a mixture of British residents returning after visiting their families and new immigrants.

Aftermath

The emergency services established a temporary triage facility and rescue centre outside Yew Tree Cottage and later an incident room at Horley police station. Survivors were taken into Fernhill House before being transferred to Redhill General Hospital or, in the case of five badly burned people, the McIndoe Burns Unit at East Grinstead Hospital. Two passengers died en route to Redhill General. The baby who survived in the wreckage of the house was also taken there suffering from "severe bruising and slight cuts".

The victims' bodies were transferred to the St. John Ambulance Hall at Massetts Road in Horley, where a temporary mortuary was set up. Relatives were then taken there to identify them. Some bodies were so badly burnt that personal effects had to be used to confirm the victim's identity. Other bodies were moved later to the Kenyon's undertakers firm in London. Inquiries into the 50 deaths started within days: the first inquest was that of William and Ann Jones, held at Reigate from 10 January 1969.

Queen Elizabeth II conveyed a message of condolence to Mohammed Zahir Shah, King of Afghanistan. Five police officers, including PC Simmonds, were awarded the Queen's Commendation for Brave Conduct in respect of their "service exceeding the bounds of duty" at the crash site. Also given this award were five local residents and a passenger on the aircraft who returned to the inferno to rescue family members and also put out the flames on another passenger's clothes.

In terms of fatalities, the accident was (and remains as of ) the worst in the vicinity of Gatwick Airport. It was the first serious incident at the airport since a crash in February 1959, when a Vickers Viscount operated by Turkish Airlines came down in a wooded area between Rusper and Newdigate, also on the Surrey/Sussex border, killing 14 passengers and injuring the Turkish Prime Minister Adnan Menderes.

Investigation and cause

Investigators found the cause of the crash was pilot error by the captain. His decision to land at Gatwick was an "error of judgment" brought about by the "deceptive nature" of the weather conditions, which were very difficult—although this itself did not cause the accident. Instead, failure to extend the flaps in the correct sequence and at an appropriate speed caused the aircraft to fall below its glide slope, roll to the right in a nose-high attitude, and crash.

The accident report noted that YA-FAR had a full and "serviceable" instrument panel, a working VHF omnidirectional radio range (VOR) system and Instrument landing system (ILS) equipment. "Satisfactory and routine" communication between air traffic control and the aircraft was noted, and the cockpit voice recorder was recovered. There was also a flight recorder unit in the rear of the fuselage, and this was recovered on 6 January and its contents analysed.

The Captain's decision to fly to London rather than remain at Frankfurt was not criticised: he could have landed at Heathrow and Stansted, where the weather was clear, instead of Gatwick if he felt conditions were too bad, and the aircraft could even return to Germany if necessary. By the time the aircraft approached Gatwick, the runway visual range was  according to the latest weather report at 2350 on 4 January, and was not expected to improve that night; furthermore, this reading was confirmed at 0123 and 0127. At the time, British-registered aircraft were not allowed to land at an airport at a time when its runway visual range was lower than its "declared minimum" (Gatwick's was ), but foreign aircraft had their own rules and were not subject to British legislation. Ariana Afghan Airlines pilots were instructed not to land when the runway visual range was lower than an airport's declared minimum (although this was not prohibited by law), but they could use their judgment on whether to descend to critical height ( for this aircraft) and then attempt a landing.

Captain Nowroz "decided that since patchy fog shifts quickly he would make an approach with a view to landing at Gatwick". The accident report stated that because he was relying principally on visual indications as he came in to land, he may have been distracted from his flight-deck duties; and patchy fog in otherwise clear conditions has been known to severely affect the sighting of visual references, sometimes leading to "disastrous errors of judgment".

Nevertheless, Captain Nowroz's decision to approach Gatwick with a view to landing there presented "no undue risk" and did not cause the accident. Instead, the cause was found to be a series of changes to speed, power and flap angle settings which were not in accordance with the airline's operating procedures and which took place in the last  of the approach. At 0128, the aircraft picked up the ILS localiser beam, and the flaps were lowered in three stages as the aircraft's speed reduced. Soon afterwards, as it approached the ILS glideslope beam, its height and speed were reduced further and the undercarriage was extended. Then the Captain saw a light which he mistook for one at the far end of the runway—it was actually on a hill beyond the airport—and the "stabiliser out of trim" warning light came on. This had been faulty earlier in the flight, and the Captain disengaged the autopilot and the automatic glideslope tracker. At 0133, the flap angle was increased; the aircraft then began to fall below the approach slope and was travelling faster than the crew thought.

The first three flap adjustments took place at higher speeds than recommended in the airline's procedures, although they did not exceed the Boeing 727's limits. The undercarriage was extended at too high a speed, and the next flap adjustment should have been done in two stages. The sudden change of angle caused the nose to pitch downwards and the aircraft to descend more rapidly than was appropriate for the conditions. The accident report states that during this 45-second period, they may have been preoccupied by looking for visual confirmation of their position, such as the runway lights.
  
The legislation prohibiting British aircraft from landing when the runway visual range was too short was extended in September 1969 to cover aircraft from all other countries when flying to airports anywhere in the United Kingdom.

See also
American Airlines Flight 383
Garuda Indonesia Flight 150

Notes

References

Bibliography

External links

"Air Transport: Ariana Accident: First Findings". Flight International, 23 January 1969. pp. 127–128.
Aviation Safety Network  – Accident description

"Picture of YA-FAR – Boeing 727-113C aircraft" – Airliners.com
"Report on the Accident to Boeing 727-112C YA-FAR 1.5 miles east of London (Gatwick) Airport on 5th January 1969"  – Gatwick Aviation Society
"Fatal Plane Crashes and Significant Events for the Boeing 727" – airsafe.com
"Aircraft Accident, Gatwick", HC Deb 20 January 1969 vol 776 cc40-4 – Hansard
"Gatwick – Boeing Crash 1969"  – British Pathe
"Accident details" – planecrashinfo.com
 – airdisaster.com
Cockpit Voice Recorder transcript and accident summary
"England Plane Crash Said Pilot Error" – The Evening Independent – 6 Jan 1969

Aviation accidents and incidents in 1969
Aviation accidents and incidents in England
Accidents and incidents involving the Boeing 727
Airliner accidents and incidents involving fog
Ariana Afghan Airlines accidents and incidents
1969 disasters in the United Kingdom
1969 in England
Disasters in Surrey
Disasters in Sussex
Transport in Surrey
Transport in West Sussex
January 1969 events in the United Kingdom
Airliner accidents and incidents in the United Kingdom